The Neapolitan Mastiff or  is an Italian breed of large dog of mastiff type. It descends from the traditional guard dogs of central Italy. It was recognised as a breed by the Ente Nazionale della Cinofilia Italiana in 1949, and accepted by the Fédération Cynologique Internationale in 1956.

It is closely related to the Cane Corso.

History 

The Neapolitan Mastiff derives from the traditional catch and guard dogs of central Italy. Selection of the breed was begun in 1947 by Piero Scanziani, who had seen one at an exhibition in Naples in 1946. He drew up the first standard, which in 1949 was officially recognised by the Ente Nazionale della Cinofilia Italiana. It received full acceptance from the Fédération Cynologique Internationale in 1956.

Characteristics 

The Neapolitan Mastiff is large and powerful, with a weight in the range  and a height at the withers of  The length of the body is about 15% greater than the height.

The skin is abundant and loose, particularly on the head where it hangs in heavy wrinkles. The preferred coat colours are black, grey and leaden, but mahogany, fawn, fulvous, hazelnut, dove-grey and isabelline are also acceptable; all coats may be brindled, and minor white markings on the toes and chest are tolerated.

A Neapolitan Mastiff may be expected to live for up to 10 years. A survey in the United Kingdom found an average lifespan of 7 years, with some 16% living past the age of 9 years.

References 

FCI breeds
Mastiffs
Dog breeds originating in Italy